Vuk Karadžić (Serbian Cyrillic: Вук Караџић), is а Yugoslavian historical drama television series which depicts the life and work of Vuk Stefanović Karadžić (7 November 1787 – 7 February 1864), a Serbian linguist and reformer of the Serbian language.

Cast
Miki Manojlović as Vuk Karadžić
Aleksandar Berček as Miloš Obrenović
Branimir Brstina as Mateja Nenadović
Dragana Varagić as Ana Karadžić
Marko Nikolić as Karađorđe Petrović
Petar Kralj as Jernej Kopitar
Bata Živojinović as Jakov Nenadović
Svetozar Cvetković as Petar Nikolajević Moler
Milan Štrljić as Dimitrije Davidović
Dragan Zarić as Jevrem Obrenović
Vladan Živković as Sima Milosavljević-Paštramac
Ljuba Tadić as Bishop Stefan Stratimirović
Danilo Lazović as Stefan Karadžić
Adem Cejvan as Mladen Milovanović
Dušan Janićijević as Jevta Savić Čotrić
Gala Videnović as Ruža Todorova
Aljoša Vučković as Toma Vučić Perišić
Milorad Mandić as Igrić
Tihomir Stanić as Jovan Sterija Popović
Ivan Jagodić as Stevan Radičević
Irfan Mensur as Lukijan Mušicki
Snežana Savić as Vuk's mother
Demeter Bitenc as Seledicki
Ivan Klemenc as Filip Višnjić
Rastislav Jović as Stojan Simić
Predrag Miletić as Miloš Pocerac
Jovan Nikčević as Sima Marković
Miloš Žutić as Jovan Hadžić
Gorica Popović as Ljubica Obrenović
Radoš Bajić as Sima Milutinović Sarajlija
Branislav Lečić as Hajduk Veljko Petrović
Žarko Radić as Antonije Bogićević
Eva Ras as Mrs Kraus
Minja Vojvodić as Stanoje Glavaš
Dušan Jakšić as Melentije Pavlović
Dragomir Čumić as Avram Petronijević
Žarko Laušević as Mihailo Obrenović
Borivoje Kandić as young Vuk Karadžić
Petar Božović as Đorđe Ćurčija
Jovan-Burduš Janjićijević as Monk Isaija
Lazar Ristovski as Pavle Cukić
Branislav Jerinić as Marathli Ali Paşa
Milan Mihailović as Gavrilo Hranislav
Milutin Butković as Bishop Leontije
Josif Tatić as Mihailo Filipović
Goran Sultanović as Mileta Radojković
Milo Miranović as Milovan Vidaković
Miloš Kandić as Vujica Vulićević
Tihomir Arsić as Branko Radićević
Maja Sabljić as Mina Karadžić
Zoran Cvijanović as Alexander Karađorđević
Dragan M. Nikolić as Đura Daničić
Savo Radović as Blažo
Aleš Valič as Franz Miklosich
Milenko Zablaćanski as Lazar Arsenijević
Stevo Žigon as Prince Klemens Wenzel von Metternich
Miodrag Radovanović as Dositej Obradović
Miša Janketić as Melentije Nikšić
Vesna Malohodžić as Princess Sara Karapandžić
Vasja Stanković as Zvornik aga
Nenad Nenadović as young Dimitrije Davidović
Mira Furlan as Petrija
Andrija Maričić as young Sima Milutinović Sarajlija
Faruk Begoli as Sereč aga
Predrag Bjelac as Georgije Magarešević
Lepomir Ivković as Tešan Podrugović
Miodrag Radovanović as General Zenaji
Ljubomir Čipranić as Petar Jokić
Stojan Dečermić as Ioannis Kapodistrias
Marinko Šebez as Pavle Ivelić
Toma Jovanović as Hegumen Kreštić
Ljubo Škiljević as Nikola Novaković
Damir Šaban as Jacob Grimm
Nebojša Bakočević as Jovan Subotić
Mihajlo Viktorovć as Joakim Vujić
Zoran Stoiljković as Mus-Aga
Mirjana Nikolić as Princess Julija
Bogdan Mihailović as Peasant
Vojislav Brajović as Leopold von Ranke
Gordana Gadžić as Milica Stojadinović Srpkinja
Erol Kadić as Dimitrije Demetar
Dragan Laković as Rajović
Mladen Nelević as Petar II Petrović-Njegoš
Milan Gutović as Stevan Perkov Vukotić
Darko Tomović as Nikola I Petrović-Njegoš
Nikola Simić as Doctor Joseph Schcoda
Miljenko Belečić as Ivan Mažuranić
Đorđe David as Laza
Olivera Ježina as Čučuk Stana
Dušan Tadić as Radulović, the merchant
Ljupko Todorovski as Mehmed Aga
Milan Srdoč as Radič Petrović

External links 
 

Historical television series
1987 Yugoslav television series debuts
1988 Yugoslav television series endings
1980s Yugoslav television series
Serbian drama television series
Radio Television of Serbia original programming
Works by Milovan Vitezović
Serbian-language television shows
Serbian Revolution
Television shows set in Serbia
Television shows filmed in Serbia
Cultural depictions of Serbian monarchs
Cultural depictions of Vuk Karadžić
Cultural depictions of Karađorđe